John 2 is the second chapter of the Gospel of John in the New Testament of the Christian Bible. It contains the famous stories of the miracle of Jesus turning water into wine and Jesus expelling the money changers from the Temple. The author of the book containing this chapter is anonymous, but early Christian tradition uniformly affirmed that John composed this gospel.

The chapter and verse divisions did not appear in the original texts, they form part of the paratext of the Bible. Since the early 13th century, most copies and editions of the Bible present all but the shortest of these books with divisions into chapters. Since the mid-16th century editors have further subdivided each chapter into verses.

Text
The original text was written in Koine Greek. This chapter is divided into 25 verses.

Textual witnesses
Some early manuscripts containing the text of this chapter are:
Papyrus 75 (AD 175–225)
Papyrus 66
Codex Vaticanus (325–350)
Codex Sinaiticus (330–360)
Codex Alexandrinus (400–440)

Context
The events recorded in chapter one of the Gospel of John take place in Bethabara (or Bethany), "beyond the Jordan", but in John 1:43 it is reported that "Jesus wanted to go to Galilee". Chapter two opens with Jesus, his mother and his disciples present in Galilee, in the village of Cana. Four "days" have been mentioned in John 1,  ("the next day") occurring in verses 29, 35 and 43. John 2 opens on the "third day". The second/third century theologian Origen suggested this was the third day from the last-named day in John 1:44 and the Jamieson-Fausset-Brown Bible Commentary argues that it would take Jesus three days to travel from Bethabara in Perea to Cana in Galilee. Lutheran pietist Johann Bengel suggests that this was the third day after the promise given to Nathaniel at the end of chapter 1, but also that the sign given in Cana was "a specimen of its fulfilment", whereas the 19th-century theologian Heinrich Ewald suggested the third day would be reckoned from Jesus' arrival in Cana.

Water into wine (2:1-11)

The second chapter of John begins at "a village wedding"  celebrated in Cana attended by the mother of Jesus (she is not named in the gospel), Jesus himself and his disciples, who are now "five or six in number, Andrew, John, Peter, Philip, Nathanael, and probably James". The hosts run out of wine, and Jesus' mother asks him to help. Jesus replies "What [is that] to me and to you?". Some interpretations suggest that Jesus is annoyed that she would ask him for a miracle, and he replies that it is not his "time" yet. The Holman Christian Standard Bible presents two interpretations, either "What has this concern of yours to do with Me?" or "You and I see things differently" whereas in the Weymouth New Testament, Jesus' words are "Leave the matter in my hands". 

Nevertheless, Jesus' mother still tells the servants to do whatever he asks, so he tells them to fill up the empty wine containers with water. Afterwards, the head waiter of the wedding tastes it and remarks to the groom that they have saved the best wine for last. John tells his audience that the water was there for the Jewish rite of purification.

According to John, this was his first sign or miracle (in Cana). It occurs immediately after Jesus has told Nathanael in John 1:50 that "You shall see greater things than that." According to the hypothesis of the Signs Gospel, this miracle was originally in that document. John uses the Greek word  meaning sign, or  meaning work, instead of the term the synoptics use,  or act of power, for miracle.

This miracle only occurs in the Gospel of John, not in any of the synoptics. The story can be understood as John's fulfillments of prophecies in the Old Testament, such as in Amos 9:13–14 and Genesis 49:10–11 about the abundance of wine that there will be in the time of the messiah. Messianic wedding festivals are mentioned in Isaiah 62:4–5. One can also perhaps see this in the synoptics in for instance Mark 2:21–22, where Jesus speaks about "new wineskins". Jesus' mother, never named in the gospel, appears again in John 19:25–27 at Jesus' crucifixion. This begins a series of stories about Jesus' role as the new way that last until his second miracle or sign, the healing of the official's son in John 4.

Interlude (2:12)
 then says that Jesus went with his mother and brothers and disciples to Capernaum for "not many days", but does not relate what went on there. Heinrich Meyer pictures Jesus travelling back to Nazareth before moving on to Capernaum, because his brothers are not mentioned as being present at the wedding in Cana but they are with him and his mother in Capernaum.

The synoptic gospels make no mention of Jesus attending the wedding before going to Capernaum, nor that his mother or brothers went there with him. Luke 4 and Matthew 4 report Jesus going to Nazareth and then Capernaum after his baptism and temptation. Mark 1 has him going to Galilee from the wilderness (where he had been tempted by Satan) and visiting several places in Galilee before reaching Capernaum. After the authority and power of Jesus had been demonstrated, He and His disciples went throughout Galilee preaching and casting out demons. Mark later records that they return to Capernaum, after going throughout the neighboring lands.

Jesus cleanses the Temple (2:13-22)

The story of Jesus overturning the tables of the money changers in the Temple is related next. Jesus and his disciples go to Jerusalem for the "Passover of the Jews", the first of three visits to Jerusalem recounted in this gospel, the others being in John 7, where he goes for the Feast of Tabernacles, and the final Passover during which he is crucified. He enters the Temple courts and sees people selling livestock and exchanging money. He explodes:

Alfred Plummer notes that Jesus acts directly with the sheep and cattle, driving them out, but as the doves could not be driven out, he gives instructions that they be removed. H. W. Watkins comments that:

John says that Jesus' disciples remembered the words of Psalm 69:9, "zeal for your house will consume me", perhaps a bit of wordplay interposing the ideas of "'demanding all my attention' and 'leading to my destruction'". Whether the disciples remembered this during the incident or afterwards is not clear: theologian Hermann Olshausen suggested that the recollection took place afterwards, but Meyer disagreed: this saying was remembered "at the very time of the occurrence", in contrast to their recollection about Jesus' foretelling of his resurrection, which happened afterwards.

Jesus is asked for "a sign" to prove that he has authority to expel the money changers. He replies "Destroy this temple, and I will raise it again in three days". The people believe he is talking about the Temple building, but John states that Jesus "was speaking of the temple of His body". The disciples remembered this after his resurrection: and they "believed the Scripture and the word", faith and memory "lend[ing] mutual help to one another in this passage".

John then says that during the Passover Feast Jesus performed miraculous signs, but does not list them, that caused people to believe in him, but that he would "not entrust himself to them, for he knew all men". Perhaps John included this statement to show Jesus possesses a knowledge of people's hearts and minds, an attribute of God.

This introduces the antagonism between Jesus and "the Jews", as John calls them, a sign perhaps of a non-Jewish audience. This is over the nature of the Temple. The Temple is already destroyed by the time of the writing of John, and John is trying to show right from the start that the old Temple has been replaced by the new Temple, Jesus' resurrected body and the new Christian and Johannine community. This shows to most scholars the split between John's community and Judaism in general. Some of the Dead Sea scrolls also speak of the community as the temple.

John mentions the incident with the money changers as occurring at the start of Jesus' ministry, while the synoptic gospels have it occurring shortly before his crucifixion. Some scholars suggest that this shows that Jesus fought with the money changers twice, once at the beginning and once at the end of his ministry. John potentially relocates the story to the beginning to show that Jesus' arrest was for the raising of Lazarus in John 11, not the incident in the Temple.

The discerner of hearts (2:23-25)
The chapter ends with a brief section which the New King James Version subtitles "The Discerner of Hearts" (John 2:23–25). While Jesus stayed in Jerusalem for the Passover feast, he performed various unrecorded signs, and many "believed in His name". Swedish-based commentator René Kieffer suggested that the evangelist "probably includes what [had] happened in Cana" among these signs. This theme is continued into chapter 3, where the Pharisee Nicodemus acknowledges that "no one can do these signs that You do unless God is with him" (John 3:2).

Notes

References

Sources

External links
 King James Bible - Wikisource
English Translation with Parallel Latin Vulgate
Online Bible at GospelHall.org (ESV, KJV, Darby, American Standard Version, Bible in Basic English)
Multiple bible versions at Bible Gateway (NKJV, NIV, NRSV etc.)

John 02